Ranjay Gulati is an Indian-American organizational scholar and currently the Paul R. Lawrence MBA Class of 1942 Professor of Business Administration at the Harvard Business School.

Early life
Ranjay Gulati graduated from St. Stephen's College at the University of Delhi in India, where he earned a bachelor's degree in economics in 1983, and Washington State University in the United States, where he earned a second bachelor's degree in computer science in 1985. He earned a master's degree in management from the MIT Sloan School of Management in 1987, and a PhD from Harvard University in Organizational Behavior in 1993.

Career
Gulati taught at Northwestern University's Kellogg School of Management from 1993 to 2008. Since 2008, he has been the Jaime and Josefina Chua Tiampo Professor of Business Administration at the Harvard Business School.

Gulati is the author of several books.

Personal life
Gulati resides in Newton, Massachusetts, U.S.

Works
Books

Articles

References

External links

Living people
St. Stephen's College, Delhi alumni
Washington State University alumni
Harvard Business School alumni
Harvard Business School faculty
American economists
MIT Sloan School of Management alumni
Place of birth missing (living people)
Year of birth missing (living people)